IGA Foodland is an Australian supermarket chain with 96 locations, primarily in South Australia, but also in the Northern Territory and New South Wales. The stores are independently owned and operated, although several operators own multiple stores, the majority of stores are owned by Metcash, the owners of national supermarket chain IGA.

History (Foodland) 
The Hoeper family established a grocery store in 1871, at glenelg South in Adelaide. In 1962, it became the first store to be branded Foodland. It has been expanded and modified over the years to become a small shopping centre, and is now run by Romeo's Retail Group.

Some larger stores were called Foodland SupaFresh, until Foodland decided to stop using the SupaFresh name.

In 2005, the Foodland brand name was bought by Metcash-owned IGA. The stores are independently owned and reflect their individual owners and locations.

In April 2014, Con Sciacca was appointed Foodland CEO, having previously held several positions at Metcash. In July 2020, Foodland's previous CEO, Con Sciacca, will hand over to Franklin Dos Santos the new CEO role.

From 2015 to 2021, Foodland and their South Australian customers helped raise $82,935 for Minda Inc disability communities.

Major Foodland Operators

Romeo's Retail Group 

Romeo's Retail Group owns (September 2019) 39 Foodland IGA stores. A notable store is located in and off Rundle Mall in the Adelaide city.

Romeo's new warehouse size Supa Valu mega supermarkets in Doonside.

The Romeo's have a number of its IGAs called Locali and "Food Hall".

Eudunda Farmers Limited 
Eudunda Farmers Ltd is a co-operative established at Eudunda in country South Australia in 1896.

Eudunda Farmers currently own and operate 18 Foodland and three IGA stores throughout country, South Australia.

Chapley Family (Brothers) 
The Chapley brothers, John and Nick, own a large number of metropolitan Adelaide Foodland stores. Commercial Retail Group (CRG) runs two of the flagship stores, at Pasadena and Frewville. The latter won the "International Retailer of the Year excellence award" at the IGA Conference in the US in 2016. The Pasadena and Frewville stores trade as "the world's finest awarded supermarkets".

Munno Para, Norwood, Henley Square, Saint's, Sefton Plaza Foodland stores are run by the John Chapley Family.

Carter's Retail 

Having stores in Coober Pedy, that's an IGA also a Hardware store. And a store in Naracoorte which is a Foodland.

Klose Family 
The Klose family runs a number of Foodland supermarkets in the Adelaide Hills, in Balhannah, Birdwood, Littlehampton, Lobethal, Nairne and Woodside.

Since the Klose family opened their doors in 1902. The Klose family have supported local farmers, growers and makers by buying local – from seasonal produce to smallgoods, chutneys to cheese, bacon to biscuits and jam to wine products.

The Klose family contributes and donates to a number of Country Fire Service stations in the Adelaide Hills.

McLeod Family 
The McLeod family run the Broken Hill Foodland store in Beryl Street.

Rugless Family 
The Rugless family, own and operator a well established Foodland Market Fresh in Brighton, South Australia, originally owned a chain of butcher shops before venturing into supermarkets. They have owned and operated 10 butcher stores.

Smith Family 
Balaklava Foodland which is run by the Smith family.

Jamal Family 

The Jamal Family run and operate the Thebarton Foodland in the western suburbs of Adelaide.

SA Supermart Family Group 

Having a number of Foodland stores in the Adelaide metro area's and in the regional area's if South Australia.

Violi & Co Supermarkets (Brothers)

See also

List of supermarket chains in Oceania

References

External links

Romeo's Retail Group
Commercial Retail Group - Adelaide's Finest Supermarkets

Supermarkets of Australia
Retail companies established in 1962
Australian grocers
Companies based in Adelaide
Australian companies established in 1962